Bifurcaria is a genus of brown algae seaweeds found on rocky North American and European shores and tidepools of the Atlantic Ocean. One species is also found on the shores of the Galapagos Islands in the Pacific Ocean.

Species 
Bifurcaria bifurcata
Bifurcaria galapagensis
Bifurcaria rotunda

Uses 
Bifurcaria is a source of unique diterpenoids which may prove pharmaceutically beneficial.
In one preliminary study, an extract of Bifurcaria bifurcata halted the proliferation of cancer cells.

References 

Fucales
Fucales genera